The 2009–10 Indiana State Sycamores men's basketball team represented Indiana State University in the 2009–10 NCAA Division I men's basketball season. The Sycamores were led by head coach Kevin McKenna in his third year leading the team. Indiana State played their home games at the Hulman Center in Terre Haute, Indiana, as members of the America East Conference. 

The Sycamores finished conference play with a 9–9 record, earning the sixth seed in the Missouri Valley tournament. Indiana State lost in the quarterfinals of the MVC tournament to Illinois.

Indiana State failed to qualify for the NCAA tournament, but were invited to the 2010 College Basketball Invitational. The Sycamores were eliminated in the first round of the CBI by Saint Louis, 63–54.

After the season, McKenna resigned as Indiana State's head coach to join Dana Altman's staff at Oregon as an assistant coach. Associate head coach Greg Lansing was promoted to head coach shortly thereafter.

The Sycamores finished the season with a 17–15 record.

Roster 

Source

Schedule and results

|-
!colspan=9 style=|Exhibition

|-
!colspan=9 style=|Regular season

|-
!colspan=9 style=| Missouri Valley tournament

|-
!colspan=9 style=| CBI

References

Indiana State Sycamores men's basketball seasons
Indiana State
Indiana State
Indiana State men's basketball
Indiana State men's basketball